Dermot "Peggy" Feely is a former Gaelic footballer who played as a goalkeeper for Derrygonnelly Harps and the Fermanagh county team.

Feely played for his club until he was 42 years old. He won six Fermanagh Senior Football Championships and played more than 500 matches over 25 years.

He also played for Donegal Boston. He went there in the middle of 1998.

References

Year of birth missing (living people)
Living people
Donegal Boston Gaelic footballers
Fermanagh inter-county Gaelic footballers
Gaelic football goalkeepers